Scythris palustris is a moth belonging to the family Scythrididae. The species was first described by Zeller in 1855.

It is native to Europe.

References

palustris